Graciela Paraskevaidis (1 April 1940 – 21 February 2017) was an Argentine writer and composer of Greek ancestry who lived and worked in Uruguay.

Life
Graciela Paraskevaidis was born in Buenos Aires. She studied composition at the National Conservatory in Buenos Aires with Roberto García Morillo and at the Instituto Torcuato Di Tella with Gerardo Gandini and Iannis Xenakis from 1965-66 with a scholarship from the Centro Latinoamericano de Altos Estudios Musicales (CLAEM). She continued her studies at the Musikhochschule Freiburg/Breisgau with Wolfgang Fortner from 1968-71 with a grant from the Deutscher Akademischer Austauschdienst. She studied at Darmstadt in 1972.

After completing her studies, Parakevaidis took a position at the Universidad Nacional in Montevideo where she taught from 1985–92 and also worked as a composer. Her works have been performed internationally in Europe, Asia and the Americas. She has written two books La obra sinfónica de Eduardo Fabini published in 1992 and Luis Campodónico, compositor published in 1999, and a number of articles on 20th-century Latin-American music published in the journals Pauta, Mexico, and MusikTexte, Germany. She published a translation of Schoenbergs Zeichen by Jean-Jacques Dünki in 2005.

Paraskevaídis served as co-editor of World New Music Magazine and the yearbook of ISCM. She was an organizer of the Latin American Contemporary Music Courses (CLAMC) from 1975-89. With Max Nyffeler she  co-founded the website latinoamérica música in 2004 and has served  co-editor. She holds both Argentinean and Uruguayan citizenship, and has lived in Uruguay since 1975.

She was married to musicologist Coriún Aharonián.

Honors and awards
Residency at Berliner Künstlerprogramm of the Deutscher Akademischer Austauschdienst (1984)
Goethe Medal from the Goethe-Institut in Munich (1994)
Attended the First Symposium of Artists and Intellectuals of Greek Origin (1985) on an invitation from the Government of Greece
Award from the Argentine National Endowment for the Arts
Award from the City of Buenos Aires
Award from the Akademie der Künste in Berlin
Award from the Young Musicians of Uruguay
Morosoli Silver Award (Morosoli) from the Fundación Lolita Rubial in Minas, Uruguay (2006)

Works
Paraskevaídis composes mostly for chamber ensemble, choral, vocal, and piano performance. Selected works include:
 
Aphorismen(text by Karl Kraus), 2 speakers, piano, percussion, tape, 1969
Mozart (text by Wolfgang Amadeus Mozart), actor, ensemble, 1970–72
magma I, 4 French horns, 2 Trumpets, 2 trombones, tuba, 1965-67 *magma II, 4 trombones, 1968
Trio, flute, clarinet, bassoon, 1969
Mellonta tauta, accordion, 1970
magma III, flute, trombone, cello, piano, 1974
magma IV, string quartet, 1974
magma V, 4 kena (Andean flutes), 1977
todavía no, 3 flutes, 3 clarinets, 1979
magma VI, 2 Trumpets, 2 Trombones, 1979
 más fuerza tiene, clarinet, 1984
magma VII, 14 winds, 1984
dos piezas para pequeño conjunto, oboe, clarinet, trumpet, piano, claves, 1989
sendas, flute, oboe, clarinet, bassoon, French horn, trumpet, trombone, piano, 1992
el nervio de arnold, guitar, 1992
algún sonido de la vida, 2 oboes, 1993
ta, flute, oboe, clarinet, piano, 1994
No quiero oír ya más campanas, 14 winds, 1995
dos piezas para oboe y piano, 1995
hacen así, 6 percussion, 1996
altibajos, 2 double basses, 1996
libres en el sonido presos en el sonido, flute (+ alto flute), clarinet, 1997
La terra e la morte (text by Cesare Pavese), mixed chorus, 1968 *libertà goes by ... (Text by Dante Alighieri), mixed chorus, 1969
E Desidero only colori (text by Cesare Pavese), female chorus, 1969
Die Hand voller Stunden (text by Paul Celan), 9 mixed voices, 1970
Schattenreich (text by Hans Magnus Enzensberger), 4 mixed voices, 1972
der Weg (text from the Old Testament), 9 mixed voices, brass ensemble, 1973
the outcry, mixed chorus, 1987
discord, 9 mixed voices, 1998
replication, harpsichord, 2006
huauqui, tape, 1975
A entera revisación del público en general, tape, 1978–81

References

1940 births
2017 deaths
Argentine classical composers
Uruguayan composers
Women classical composers
Argentine music educators
Writers from Buenos Aires
Argentine people of Greek descent
Uruguayan people of Greek descent
20th-century classical composers
21st-century classical composers
Argentine musicologists
Uruguayan musicologists
Women musicologists
Women music educators
20th-century women composers
21st-century women composers
Argentine women composers
Argentine women educators